Jarrad Prue (born 11 February 1982) is an Australian former basketball player and current coach. He played 15 seasons with the Lakeside Lightning of the NBL1 West and is considered one of the NBL1 West's all-time best, having earned the title as the league's greatest ever rebounder. In 2013, he had a three-game stint with the Perth Wildcats of the National Basketball League (NBL). In 2020, he was appointed president of the Lakeside Lightning.

Early life
Prue grew up playing more cricket than basketball.

Basketball career

Early years (2003–2005)
Prue debuted for the Lakeside Lightning in the State Basketball League (SBL) in 2003 and quickly became a significant contributor thanks to his coach, Andy Stewart. He averaged 3.96 points and 6.4 rebounds in 24 games in his first season and 9.65 points and 18.5 rebounds in 26 games in 2004. In 2005, he had a nine-game stint with the Willetton Tigers, where he averaged a career-best 14.56 points to go with 14.2 rebounds.

String of grand finals and championships (2006–2013)
Prue returned to the Lakeside Lightning in 2006 and helped them win the championship after defeating the Goldfields Giants 83–66 in the SBL Grand Final. In his first championship decider, Prue had 10 points and 13 rebounds. For the season, he averaged 12.97 points and 19.1 rebounds in 30 games.

In 2007, Prue helped the Lightning win their first ever minor premiership after finishing the regular season in first place with a 20–4 record. They went on to reach the SBL Grand Final, where they were defeated 96–94 by the Giants despite Prue's equal game-high 18 rebounds. In 29 games, he averaged 9.7 points and 15.3 rebounds per game.

After appearing in just five games in 2008 due to semi-retirement, Prue captained Lakeside to the minor premiership in 2009 after the team finished the regular season in first place with a 22–4 record. They went on to reach the SBL Grand Final, where they defeated the Perry Lakes Hawks 85–77. In the championship decider, Prue had 14 points and 12 rebounds. In 30 games, he averaged 11.6 points and 18.5 rebounds per game.

In 2010, the Lightning won the minor premiership after finishing the regular season in first place with a 21–5 record. They went on to reach the SBL Grand Final, where they were defeated 107–96 by the Willetton Tigers despite Prue's 20 points and 21 rebounds. In 31 games, he averaged 10.6 points and 19.7 rebounds per game. Following the 2010 season, Prue captained the SBL All-Star Team on a two-game tour to Indonesia.

In 2011, the Lightning failed to reach the grand final despite claiming their third straight minor premiership with a team-best 24–2 record. In 30 games, Prue averaged 7.9 points and 21.4 rebounds per game.

In 2012, the Lightning finished the regular season in second place with a 22–4 record, and were defeated in the semi-finals for the second straight year. In 29 games, Prue averaged 10.4 points and 18.8 rebounds per game.

In 2013, Prue played his 250th SBL game, led the league in rebounding for the eighth time, and became the all-time leading SBL rebounder. Lakeside won their fifth minor premiership in seven years after finishing the regular season in first place with a 23–3 record. They advanced through the first two rounds of the finals undefeated to reach the SBL Grand Final. In the championship decider on 31 August, the Lightning defeated the Wanneroo Wolves 77–74, with Prue recording 22 rebounds in a captain's effort to claim his third SBL championship. In 31 games, he averaged 7.9 points and 20.3 rebounds per game.

Perth Wildcats (2013)
On 8 September 2013, Prue played for the SBL All-Star Team in an exhibition game against the Perth Wildcats. Later that month, Prue had a two-game trial with the Wildcats during their NBL preseason schedule. He impressed coach Trevor Gleeson during his trial period, and on 2 October 2013, Prue signed with the Wildcats as a short-term replacement for injured centre Matt Knight. At 31 years of age, Prue said he never expected this opportunity to happen, despite having played under Wildcats assistant Andy Stewart at Lakeside for many years. Prue said upon signing, "As a kid you always dream to play in the NBL, for this team, but after all these years I never expected it to be something that would eventuate and due to circumstances it's come off, and I'm really excited about the opportunity".

Prue appeared in three of the Wildcats' first six games to begin the 2013–14 NBL season. On 1 November 2013, in his third and final game, Prue had seven rebounds in nine minutes of action in an 87–47 win over the Wollongong Hawks. He finished with nine rebounds in his three games. Knight returned from injury in the Wildcats' next home game on 14 November.

Later years and retirement (2014–2021)

2014 season
In Lakeside's opening game of the 2014 season, Prue grabbed 31 rebounds in a 101–88 win over the East Perth Eagles. He went on to record a career-best 24.16 rebounds per game during the regular season. On 2 August 2014, in the first game of the Lightning's quarter-final series against the Stirling Senators, Prue played his 300th SBL game. Over 300 games, Prue recorded 5,450 rebounds and 2,973 points with a field goal percentage of 69%. Prue finished the 2014 season with averages of 12.0 points and 24.0 rebounds in 30 games.

Off-season
In September 2014, Prue captained the SBL All-Star Team in an exhibition game against the Perth Wildcats, and played for the South All-Stars in the first North v South SBL All-Star game in over a decade.

In January 2015, the Wildcats required a short-term replacement player for sidelined centre Matt Knight; Prue was touted as a possible injury replacement, but he was ultimately not signed.

2015 season
In Lakeside's opening game of the 2015 season, Prue grabbed 26 rebounds off the bench in a 100–91 win over the Cockburn Cougars. On 1 June 2015, Prue competed in the SBL All-Star Game for the South All-Stars, coming off the bench to record 13 points and eight rebounds in a 143–135 win over the North All-Stars. In the Lightning's season finale, Prue grabbed a season-high 32 rebounds in a 99–92 loss to the Goldfields Giants. The Lightning were in unfamiliar territory in 2015; their 13-year run of making the finals ended as they finished in 12th position with a 9–17 record while losing their last seven matches. Since joining the SBL in 2000, the Lightning had been a powerful force in the SBL, never going through a season winning single-digit games. In the previous 15 seasons, their worst record was 11–15 when they last missed the finals in 2001. Prue appeared in all 26 games in 2015, averaging 8.0 points and 17.5 rebounds per game.

Prue retired following the 2015 season. In 330 games, he had recorded a league-best 5,998 rebounds. With nothing left to prove and his body needing a rest, to go along with two young children and his burgeoning work career, Prue decided the time was right to hang up the boots.

2018 season

Prue came out of retirement in 2018 to return to the Lightning roster. During his time away from the SBL, he continued playing in the local league at Lakeside to maintain a degree of touch and fitness, but he had never once considered a return until new Lightning coach Dave Daniels got in contact with him. Initially Prue thought that was to help out in a coaching capacity, until Daniels outlined the dearth of bigs the Lightning would have in 2018 and that he wanted him to play. On 16 March 2018, in his first SBL game since 2015, Prue had a trademark performance with 21 rebounds in a 102–88 season-opening loss to the Perth Redbacks. On 28 April, he recorded 21 rebounds in a 98–90 win over the East Perth Eagles. He did not attempt a field goal in the game, and finished with 11 offensive rebounds. On 26 May, he recorded 13 points and 29 rebounds in an 85–81 win over the Cockburn Cougars. Eighteen of his 29 rebounds were offensive. On 4 June, Prue competed in the SBL All-Star Game for the South All-Stars, coming off the bench to record seven rebounds in a 123–110 loss to the North All-Stars. On 15 June, he had 27 rebounds, 12 of them offensive, in a 122–85 win over the Cougars. On 6 July, he played his 350th SBL game in a 110–99 win over the South West Slammers, recording 24 rebounds (13 offensive), eight points and three steals. He helped the Lightning finish the regular season in fifth place with a 15–11 record, before losing 2–1 to the Perry Lakes Hawks in the quarter-finals. In 28 games, Prue averaged 6.6 points and 19.3 rebounds per game. He subsequently earned All-Defensive Team honours.

2019 season
Prue opened the 2019 season with 28 rebounds against the Mandurah Magic, as he celebrated his 350th game for the Lightning. In round four, Prue managed just six minutes on the floor after sustaining a hamstring injury. He returned to action in round nine. On 3 June, Prue competed in the SBL All-Star Game for the Australian All-Stars, coming off the bench to record a game-high 16 rebounds in a 113–112 win over Team World. On 19 July, he had 36 rebounds (18 of them offensive) in an 82–80 win over the Kalamunda Eastern Suns. The following night, he had 27 rebounds in a 96–95 win over the Perry Lakes Hawks. He helped the Lightning finish the regular season in second place with a 20–6 record. After defeating the Goldfields Giants 2–0 in the quarter-finals, the Lightning lost 2–1 to the Geraldton Buccaneers in the semi-finals. In 26 games, Prue averaged 8.12 points and 18.31 rebounds per game. He subsequently earned All-Defensive Team honours, and was the league leader in rebounds per game and field goal percentage.

2021 NBL1 West season
After sitting out the 2020 West Coast Classic following the cancellation of the 2020 SBL season, Prue returned to the Lightning in 2021 for the inaugural NBL1 West season. On 15 May, he recorded a season-high 14 points and 17 rebounds against the South West Slammers. He recorded 20 rebounds or more three times during the season, including a season-high 23 rebounds on 22 May against the Geraldton Buccaneers. He reached 400 career games in August 2021. He averaged 5.5 points and 15.07 rebounds for the season, and was the league's rebounding leader.

Coaching career
Prue served as an assistant coach with the Lakeside Lightning men's and women's teams during the 2022 NBL1 West season.

Career statistics

Correct as of the end of the 2019 season

SBL

|-
| style="text-align:left;"| 2003
| style="text-align:left;"| Lakeside
| 24 || || || .663 || .000 || .277 || 6.4 || .8 || .5 || .5 || 4.0
|-
| style="text-align:left;"| 2004
| style="text-align:left;"| Lakeside
| 26 || || || .695 || .000 || .329 || 18.5 || 1.0 || 1.2 || 1.7 || 9.7
|-
| style="text-align:left;"| 2005
| style="text-align:left;"| Willetton
| 9 || || || .716 || .000 || .192 || 14.2 || .9 || .9 || 1.3 || 14.6
|-
| style="text-align:left;background:#afe6ba;"|2006†
| style="text-align:left;"| Lakeside
| 30 || || || .665 || .000 || .482 || 19.1 || 1.5 || 1.6 || 1.9 || 13.0
|-
| style="text-align:left;"| 2007
| style="text-align:left;"| Lakeside
| 29 || || || .666 || .250 || .465 || 15.3 || 1.3 || 1.1 || 1.2 || 9.7
|-
| style="text-align:left;"| 2008
| style="text-align:left;"| Lakeside
| 5 || || || .680 || 1.000 || .333 || 12.6 || .4 || 1.0 || 1.2 || 7.8
|-
| style="text-align:left;background:#afe6ba;"|2009†
| style="text-align:left;"| Lakeside
| 30 || || || .695 || .500 || .483 || 18.5 || 1.5 || 1.2 || 1.0 || 11.6
|-
| style="text-align:left;"| 2010
| style="text-align:left;"| Lakeside
| 31 || || || .755 || .000 || .458 || 19.7 || 1.2 || 1.5 || .8 || 10.6
|-
| style="text-align:left;"| 2011
| style="text-align:left;"| Lakeside
| 30 || || || .654 || .000 || .455 || 21.4 || 1.3 || 1.6 || 1.0 || 7.9
|-
| style="text-align:left;"| 2012
| style="text-align:left;"| Lakeside
| 29 || || || .697 || .000 || .473 || 18.8 || 1.6 || 1.0 || 1.5 || 10.4
|-
| style="text-align:left;background:#afe6ba;"|2013†
| style="text-align:left;"| Lakeside
| 31 || || || .680 || .000 || .493 || 20.3 || 2.0 || 1.3 || 1.2 || 7.9
|-
| style="text-align:left;"| 2014
| style="text-align:left;"| Lakeside
| 30 || || || .721 || .000 || .462 || 24.0 || 1.7 || 1.0 || 1.4 || 12.0
|-
| style="text-align:left;"| 2015
| style="text-align:left;"| Lakeside
| 26 || || || .756 || .000 || .468 || 17.5 || 1.5 || .8 || .7 || 8.0
|-
| style="text-align:left;"| 2018
| style="text-align:left;"| Lakeside
| 28 || || || .757 || 1.000 || .524 || 19.3 || 1.4 || 1.0 || .6 || 6.6
|-
| style="text-align:left;"| 2019
| style="text-align:left;"| Lakeside
| 26 || || || .633 || .000 || .477 || 18.3 || .9 || 1.2 || .3 || 8.1
|-
| style="text-align:center;" colspan="2"|Career
| 384 || || || .694 || .174 || .449 || 18.3 || 1.3 || 1.2 || 1.1 || 9.4

NBL

|-
| style="text-align:left;"| 2013–14
| style="text-align:left;"| Perth
| 3 || 0 || 3.8 || .000 || .000 || .000 || 3.0 || .7 || .3 || .0 || .0
|-
| style="text-align:center;" colspan="2"|Career
| 3 || 0 || 3.8 || .000 || .000 || .000 || 3.0 || .7 || .3 || .0 || .0

Personal life
Prue and his wife Emma have two children.

Off the court, Prue is an auditor, and as of June 2018, is a partner at BDO Australia.

In October 2020, Prue was appointed president of the Lakeside Lightning.

References

External links

Australiabasket.com profile
SBL stats
BDO Australia profile

1982 births
Living people
Australian men's basketball players
Centers (basketball)

Perth Wildcats players
Basketball players from Perth, Western Australia